Wood County Airport may refer to:

 Wood County Airport (Texas) in Wood County, Texas, United States (FAA: JDD)
 Wood County Airport (Ohio) in Wood County, Ohio, United States (FAA: 1G0)
 South Wood County Airport in Wood County, Wisconsin, United States (FAA: ISW)

See also
Mid-Ohio Valley Regional Airport in Wood County, West Virginia (also known as Wood County Airport)